Korotkovskaya is a rural locality (a village) in Ilezskoye Rural Settlement, Tarnogsky District, Vologda Oblast, Russia. The population was 30 as of 2002.

Geography 
Korotkovskaya is located 37 km northeast of Tarnogsky Gorodok (the district's administrative centre) by road. Okulovskaya is the nearest rural locality.

References 

Rural localities in Tarnogsky District